Printers' Ink was an American trade magazine launched in 1888 by George P. Rowell. It was the first national trade magazine for advertising. It was renamed Marketing/Communications in 1967 and ceased publication in 1972.

Printers' Ink model statute

Printers' Ink was famous for proposing a model law that created criminal penalties for false advertising in 1911. It was widely adopted in states; however, few prosecutors brought cases under it, because of prosecutorial resource constraints, and because it imposed strict liability (that is, the state did not have to prove intent to deceive) on false advertisers.

References

External links
 HathiTrust. Printers' Ink digitized issues, various dates

Business magazines published in the United States
Magazines established in 1888
Magazines disestablished in 1972
Defunct magazines published in the United States